In algebraic geometry, an affine GIT quotient, or affine geometric invariant theory quotient, of an affine scheme  with an action by a group scheme G is the affine scheme , the prime spectrum of the ring of invariants of A, and is denoted by . A GIT quotient is a categorical quotient: any invariant morphism uniquely factors through it.

A GIT quotient is a categorical quotient of the locus of semistable points; i.e., "the" quotient of the semistable locus. Since the categorical quotient is unique, if there is a geometric quotient, then the two notions coincide: for example, one has 
 
for an algebraic group G over a field k and closed subgroup H.

If X is a complex smooth projective variety and if G is a reductive complex Lie group, then the GIT quotient of X by G is homeomorphic to the symplectic quotient of X by a maximal compact subgroup of G (Kempf–Ness theorem).

Construction of a GIT quotient 
Let G be a reductive group acting on a quasi-projective scheme X over a field and L a linearized ample line bundle on X. Let 
 
be the section ring. By ampleness, each  is affine; say  and so we can form the affine GIT quotient

Note that  is of finite type by Hilbert's theorem on the ring of invariants. By universal property of categorical quotients, these affine quotients glue and result in

which is the GIT quotient of X with respect to L. Note that if X is projective; i.e., it is the Proj of R, then the quotient  is given simply as the Proj of the ring of invariants .

In such a case, the GIT quotient restricts to

which has the property: every fiber is an orbit. That is to say,  is a genuine quotient (i.e., geometric quotient) and one writes . Because of this, when  is nonempty, the GIT quotient  is often referred to as a "compactification" of a geometric quotient of an open subset of X.

A difficult and seemingly open question is: which geometric quotient arises in the above GIT fashion? The question is of a great interest since the GIT approach produces an explicit quotient, as opposed to an abstract quotient, which is hard to compute. Suppose there are an open subset  as well as a geometric quotient  such that (1)  is an affine morphism and (2)  is quasi-projective. Then  for some linearlized line bundle L on X. (An analogous question is to determine which subring is the ring of invariants in some manner.)

Examples

Finite group action by  
A simple example of a GIT quotient is given by the -action on  sending

Notice that the monomials  generate the ring . Hence we can write the ring of invariants as

Scheme theoretically, we get the morphism

This can be checked using the differentials, which are

hence the only point where the differential and the polynomial  both vanish is at the origin. The quotient obtained is a conical surface with an ordinary double point at the origin.

Torus action on plane 
This gives the GIT quotientNotice the inverse image of the point  is given by the orbits , showing the GIT quotient isn't necessarily an orbit space. If it were, there would be three origins, a non-separated space.

See also 
quotient stack
character variety
Chow quotient

Notes

References

Pedagogical

References 

Algebraic geometry